Pixels is a 2015 science fiction comedy film directed by Chris Columbus, written by Tim Herlihy and Timothy Dowling, and produced by Columbus, Adam Sandler, Allen Covert, and Mark Radcliffe. Based on the 2010 short film of the same name by Patrick Jean, the film stars Sandler, Kevin James, Michelle Monaghan, Peter Dinklage, Josh Gad, and Brian Cox. Combining computer-animated video game characters and visual effects, the film follows an alien race misinterpreting video feeds of classic arcade games as a declaration of war, resulting in them invading Earth using technology inspired by 1980s games such as Pac-Man, Space Invaders, Arkanoid, Galaga, Centipede and Donkey Kong. To counter the invasion, the United States hires former arcade champions to lead the planet's defense. Principal photography on the film began on May 28, 2014, in Toronto; filming was completed in three months.

Produced by Columbus' 1492 Pictures and Sandler's Happy Madison Productions in association with LStar Capital and China Film Co. Ltd., Pixels was released theatrically in the United States on July 24, 2015, in 2D, 3D, and IMAX 3D formats, by Sony Pictures Releasing through its Columbia Pictures label. It received generally negative reviews and grossed $244 million worldwide against a production budget of between $88 million and $129 million, similar to other video game films, especially Wreck-It Ralph (2012), Hitman: Agent 47 (2015) and Need for Speed (2014).

Plot
At a video game arcade in 1982 with his friend Will Cooper, 13-year-old Sam Brenner seemingly loses a championship game of Donkey Kong to obnoxious Eddie "The Fireblaster" Plant. Videocassette footage of the event is included in a time capsule launched into space. In the present day, Brenner is an electronics installer while Cooper is the unpopular President of the United States. In Guam, the Andersen Air Force Base is besieged by an extraterrestrial force attacking in the form of Galaga and a soldier is abducted.

Brenner works at the home of divorced U.S. Navy Commander Violet van Patten, and the two are separately summoned to the White House. Upon seeing the video footage and meeting with Ludlow "The Wonder Kid" Lamonsoff, Brenner deduces that the aliens have somehow mistaken the videocassette images for a declaration of war, and are attacking Earth with a strange technology that allows them to morph into the video games featured at the championship. The aliens interrupt a television broadcast using footage from the cassette, challenging the people of Earth to a battle where if the aliens win three times, they will conquer the planet. Brenner and Cooper are unable to stop one of the attacks as the Taj Mahal is damaged by the aliens in the form of Arkanoid and a bystander is abducted.

Brenner and Ludlow train Navy SEALs to play the games. Violet develops rayguns that are effective against the aliens. The team later heads to London, where the aliens attack Hyde Park in the form of Centipede. The soldiers begin to lose, so Brenner and Ludlow step in and shoot them down. The aliens send congratulations and a "trophy" in the form of the Duck Hunt dog to an old lady.

Ludlow and Cooper retrieve Eddie from a prison sentence for fraud before going to New York City. There, the team must fight an alien taking the form of a giant Pac-Man, playing as the ghosts. Toru Iwatani, creator of Pac-Man, tries to reason with Pac-Man peacefully, but gets his hand bitten off. Brenner, Ludlow, and Eddie overcome the challenge using modified Mini Cooper cars, but Violet notices Eddie moved at supersonic speeds around the board. Brenner is able to trick Pac-Man into going after him once the effects of the power pellet run out. They win Q*Bert as a trophy. During a celebratory party, however, the aliens announce that the challenge for the planet has been forfeited because someone cheated. Violet's son Matty discovers that not only did Eddie use a speed cheat during the battle against Pac-Man, but while playing Donkey Kong against Brenner as well. Eddie flees while Matty is abducted by the aliens.

The aliens launch a massive attack on Washington, D.C. using an army of video game characters and enemies. Cooper joins the team, while Ludlow stays to fight. An alien takes the form of "Lady Lisa", a video game character on whom Ludlow has had a crush since childhood. Ludlow persuades Lisa to choose love and side with the humans as Eddie, wishing to make amends, returns to fight. Brenner, Violet and Cooper are summoned to the aliens' mothership for one last chance to save Earth, where they face their leader, who takes the form of Donkey Kong, on the starting level with the aliens' captives at the top level. As the group dodges barrels and fireballs, Brenner is losing hope until Matty reveals Eddie cheated at Donkey Kong, meaning that Brenner was the world's best Donkey Kong player. This restored his spirit and allowed  him to keep fighting. Once Brenner defeats Donkey Kong, the aliens' forces, including Lisa, disappear from Earth.

The team is hailed as heroes and Cooper manages to reach a peace agreement with the aliens. Eddie apologizes to Brenner for cheating, and although Ludlow is saddened that Lisa is gone, Q*Bert transforms its likeness to Lady Lisa. Brenner and Violet become a couple while Eddie gets to meet Serena Williams and Martha Stewart. The aliens restore everything on Earth, including Iwatani's hand, before their departure. A year later, Lady Lisa and Ludlow marry and have Q*Bert-like children.

Cast

 Adam Sandler as Sam Brenner, a former arcade video game champion, Cooper's childhood friend, and the leader of the Arcaders.
 Anthony Ippolito as young Brenner
 Kevin James as Will "Chewie" Cooper, the President of the United States, Brenner's childhood friend, and a member of the Arcaders.
 Jared Riley as young Cooper
 Michelle Monaghan as Lieutenant Colonel Violet van Patten, a unique weapons developer and specialist for the military and a member of the Arcaders.
 Peter Dinklage as Eddie "The Fireblaster" Plant, Brenner's former rival and a member of the Arcaders. His appearance and personality are styled after real-life discredited Pac-Man and Donkey Kong champion Billy Mitchell.
 Andrew Bambridge as young Eddie
 Josh Gad as Ludlow "The Wonder Kid" Lamonsoff, a conspiracy-theory-obsessed genius with poor social skills and a member of the Arcaders.
 Jacob Shinder as young Ludlow
 Brian Cox as Admiral James Porter, a military heavyweight.
 Sean Bean as Corporal Hill
 Jane Krakowski as Jane Cooper, the First Lady of the United States and Cooper's wife.
 Affion Crockett as Sergeant Dylan Cohan, a soldier present during the Guam attack.
 Ashley Benson as Lady Lisa, the protagonist of the video game Dojo Quest.
 Matt Lintz as Matty van Patten, Violet's son.
 Lainie Kazan as Mickey Lamonsoff, Ludlow's grandmother.

Dan Aykroyd plays the emcee of the video game championship. Nick Swardson plays a bystander seen during the Pac-Man attack. Dan Patrick, Robert Smigel, and Steve Koren play reporters at the White House. Celebrities Serena Williams and Martha Stewart have cameo roles as themselves. Matt Frewer reprises his role as the voice of Max Headroom, a role he made famous during the 1980s. Steve Wiebe, a previous Donkey Kong and Donkey Kong Jr. World Record holder, plays a military scientist. Denis Akiyama portrays Toru Iwatani, the creator of the Pac-Man franchise, while the real Iwatani has a cameo role as a repairman at the arcade the Arcaders used to play at. Fiona Shaw  plays the Prime Minister of the United Kingdom. Holly Beavon and Billy West provide additional character voices.

Production

Development
The film is based on Patrick Jean's video-game-themed short film, Pixels. Adam Sandler hired Tim Herlihy to write the film, a draft that Herlihy had said that everybody at the studio "hated". Eventually he and Sandler came up with the concept of having Kevin James be the President of the United States and rewrote the film incorporating this element. In July  2012, Tim Dowling was hired to rewrite the film. Seth Gordon was attached as executive producer and possibly direct the film. Chris Columbus became involved in the project in May 2013. Columbus said he first met Sandler to discuss a possible remake of Hello Ghost, and as he left the meeting, the director was handed a script for Pixels. The script affected Columbus, who considered it "one of the most original ideas I had seen since the Amblin days" and a good opportunity to harken back to the 1980s comedies he worked on. Characters from classic arcade games such as Space Invaders, Pac-Man, Frogger, Galaga and Donkey Kong, among several others, were licensed for use in the film.

There were originally plans to include a scene where the Great Wall of China is damaged, but the concept was removed from the script in hopes to improve the film's chances in the Chinese market.

Casting
On February 26, 2014, it was announced that Sandler would play the lead role in the film, while James and Josh Gad were in early talks to join the cast. On March 28, Peter Dinklage was also in final talks to join the film, playing the fourth and final male lead. Jennifer Aniston was originally considered for the female lead, but declined due to scheduling conflicts. On April 4, Michelle Monaghan joined the film to star as the female lead. On June 11, Brian Cox joined the cast, and plays military heavyweight Admiral Porter. The part of "Lady Lisa", a beautiful warrior from the fictional 1980s video game Dojo Quest, was offered to Elisha Cuthbert, but she turned down the role, which went to Ashley Benson. On July 9, Jane Krakowski joined the cast as the First Lady.

In a May 2015 interview, competitive gamer Billy Mitchell, after whom Dinklage's character is modeled, acknowledged that the character was based on him and expressed approval of the casting, calling Dinklage "a good actor" and "a good guy".

Filming

The film was greenlit on a production budget of $135 million, but according to documents from the Sony Pictures hack, Doug Belgrad was able to negotiate it down to $110 million. On March 25, 2014, the Ontario Media Development Corporation confirmed that the film would be shot in Toronto from May 28 to September 9 at Pinewood Toronto Studios.

Principal photography on the film commenced in Toronto on June 2, 2014, using downtown streets decorated to resemble New York City. Given sequences such as the Pac-Man chase happened at night, often the filmmakers would close the streets off from traffic at 7 PM, and redecorate to resemble New York until it was dark enough, filming from 9:30 PM up to 5:30 AM. On July 29, filming was taking place outside of Markham, Ontario. Filming was also done in the Rouge Park area, and extras were dressing in costume at Markham's Rouge Valley Mennonite Church. On August 4, actors Josh Gad, Peter Dinklage and Ashley Benson were spotted in Toronto filming scenes for the film on Bay Street, which was transformed into a city block in Washington, D.C., and littered with wrecked vehicles and giant holes in the pavement. The Ontario Government Buildings was doubled to transform into a federal office building in Washington. Actors were aiming at aliens, which could not be seen, but were added later with computer-generated imagery. On August 26, 2014, filming took place in Cobourg. Filming was completed in three months, with 12 hours of shooting a day.

Visual effects
Most of the visual effects for Pixels were handled by Digital Domain and Sony Pictures Imageworks, with nine other VFX companies playing supporting roles, all under the leadership of supervisor Matthew Butler and producer Denise Davis. Early tests began in October 2013, with the majority of the effects work starting after principal photography wrapped in September 2014, and finishing by June 2015. The video game characters would be built out of boxy voxels to resemble the low resolution pixel-based arcades, while also emitting light and having raster scan defects in its animation to appear more like they came from a CRT monitor. Along with the actual sprite sheets, a major inspiration to build the 3D versions was the cabinet art, where  Imageworks visual effects supervisor Daniel Kramer considered that "was the intention the game creators wanted their technology to be, but the technology couldn't live up to creating that." The most complex characters to model were Q*Bert, which interacted the most with humans and had the problem of looking round despite being built out of cubes, and Donkey Kong, who the animators wanted to make sure remained recognizable even in different angles.

Music
The score was composed by Henry Jackman. In June 2015, Waka Flocka Flame released a single entitled "Game On", featuring Good Charlotte, which serves as part of the film's soundtrack. A rendition of "We Will Rock You" by Queen remixed by Helmut VonLichten is heard during the film's Donkey Kong scenes.

Release

Theatrical
The film was originally scheduled to be released on May 15, 2015, but on August 12, 2014, the release date was pushed to July 24, 2015. In the United States and Canada, it was released in the Dolby Vision format in Dolby Cinema, which is the first film by Sony to ever be released in that format.

Marketing
The first trailer was released on March 19, 2015, and received 34.3 million global views in 24 hours, breaking Sony's previous record held by The Amazing Spider-Man 2 (22 million views in 2014). The second trailer was released on June 13, 2015. Upon release of the trailer, fans of the TV series Futurama noted similarities between the trailer and a 2002 episode of the show, "Anthology of Interest II".

Sony created an "Electric Dreams Factory Arcade" with many of the arcade games featured in the film for various fan conventions, such as the 2014 San Diego Comic-Con and the 2015 Wizard World Philadelphia.  In Brazil, a promotional video was released on July 2, 2015, showing Adam Sandler interacting with Monica and Jimmy Five from local comic Monica's Gang.

Copyright takedown controversy
Columbia Pictures hired Entura International to send Digital Millennium Copyright Act takedown notices to websites hosting user-uploaded videos of the film. The company proceeded to file DMCA takedown notices indiscriminately against several Vimeo videos containing the word "Pixels" in the title, including the 2010 award-winning short film the film is based on, the official film trailer, a 2006 independently produced Cypriot film uploaded by the Independent Museum of Contemporary Art, a 2010 university work by a student of the Bucharest National University of Arts, a royalty-free stock footage clip and an independently produced project. The takedown notice sent by Entura stated that the works infringe a copyright they had the right to enforce, and once the notice was made public, it was withdrawn.

Home media
Pixels was released on Blu-ray (3D and 2D) and DVD on October 20, 2015. According to The Numbers, the domestic DVD sales are  $7,181,924 and the Blu-ray sales are $6,426,936.

Reception

Box office
Pixels grossed $78.7 million in North America and $164.9 million in other territories for a worldwide total of $244.9 million. Reports of the production budget of the film range from $88 million to $129 million, with Sony Pictures officially stating the cost as $110 million. The film received tax rebates of $19 million for filming in Canada.

In the United States and Canada, Pixels opened alongside Paper Towns, Southpaw and The Vatican Tapes, in 3,723 theaters. Box office pundits noted that the film's release date caused it to face competition with the first former film and along with the holdovers Ant-Man and Minions, all of which were projected to earn around $20 million. However, some analysts suggested the film could open to as high as $30 million and if it failed to hit $30 million, it could have difficulty being profitable unless it earned a significant audience abroad. It made $1.5 million from its Thursday night showings at 2,776 theaters, and topped the box office on its opening day, earning $9.2 million. Through its opening weekend it grossed $24 million from 3,723 theaters, debuting at second place at the box office, behind Ant-Man.

Critical response
On review aggregator Rotten Tomatoes, the film has an approval rating of 18% based on 207 reviews; the average rating is 4/10. The website's critical consensus reads, "Much like the worst arcade games from the era that inspired it, Pixels has little replay value and is hardly worth a quarter." On Metacritic, the film has a weighted average score of 27 out of 100, based on 37 critics, indicating "generally unfavorable reviews". Audiences polled by CinemaScore gave the film an average grade of "B" on an A+ to F scale.

Peter Travers of Rolling Stone gave the film one star out of four, calling it "a 3D metaphor for Hollywood's digital assault on our eyes and brains" and deeming it "relentless and exhausting". In Salon.com, Andrew O'Hehir called the film "another lazy Adam Sandler exercise in 80s Nostalgia", as well as "an overwhelmingly sad experience" characterized by "soul-sucking emptiness". The Guardian called it "casually sexist, awkwardly structured, bro-centric" and warned, "Pity the poor souls who go into the comedy blockbuster thinking they've signed up to watch The Lego Movie by way of Independence Day. They'll be disappointed". Joe Neumaier of the New York Daily News gave the film no stars and wrote, "Someone please retire Adam Sandler. Pixels is the last straw for this has-been...Every joke is forced, every special effect is un-special...The dipstick Pixels is about as much fun as a joystick and not even half as smart". "It manages to achieve the weird effect of feeling overlong and choppy at the same time, like someone edited the film with a pair of garden shears," wrote Randy Cordova in The Arizona Republic. Kyle Smith wrote in the New York Post that Pixels is "as adolescent as a zit" with jokes "as fresh as the antique store".

"Everything is wrong here," wrote Megan Garber in The Atlantic Monthly, "cinematically, creatively, maybe even morally. Because Pixels is one of those bad movies that isn't just casually bad, or shoot-the-moon bad, or too-close-to-the-sun bad, or actually kind of delightfully bad. It is tediously bad. It is bafflingly bad. It is, in its $90 million budget and 104-minute run time, wastefully bad. Its badness seems to come not from failure in the classic sense—a goal set, and unachieved—but from something much worse: laziness. Ambivalence. A certain strain of cinematic nihilism". Peter Sobczynski, writing for RogerEbert.com, called the premise promising but the execution "abysmal."

Conversely, Katie Walsh, reviewing for the Chicago Tribune, was more positive, saying "despite [its] unfortunate shortcomings, Pixels has its funny and fresh moments, thanks in large part to the supporting comic actors and inventive special effects".

Accolades

References

External links

 
 

2015 films
2010s English-language films
2015 3D films
2015 action comedy films
2010s buddy films
2015 science fiction action films
2010s science fiction comedy films
American 3D films
American buddy films
American science fiction action films
American action comedy films
American science fiction comedy films
Chinese 3D films
Chinese science fiction action films
Chinese science fiction comedy films
Chinese action comedy films
English-language Chinese films
Alien abduction films
Alien invasions in films
American crossover films
Giant monster films
IMAX films
1492 Pictures films
Columbia Pictures films
Happy Madison Productions films
Features based on short films
Films directed by Chris Columbus
Films produced by Michael Barnathan
Films produced by Chris Columbus
Films produced by Adam Sandler
Films produced by Allen Covert
Films scored by Henry Jackman
Films about fictional presidents of the United States
Films about dysfunctional families
American films about revenge
Films about video games
Self-reflexive films
Films set in 1982
Films set in 2015
Films set in Brooklyn
Films set in Guam
Films set in London
Films set in Manhattan
Films set in the White House
Films set in Washington, D.C.
Films set in Uttar Pradesh
Films shot in Toronto
American films with live action and animation
2010s American films
Cultural depictions of Madonna